The 2012–13 Providence Friars men's basketball team represented Providence College during the 2012–13 NCAA Division I men's basketball season. The Friars, led by second-year head coach Ed Cooley, played their home games at the Dunkin' Donuts Center and were members of the Big East Conference. The Friars finished the season 19–15, 9–9 in Big East play to finish in a tie for ninth place. They lost to Cincinnati in the second round of the Big East tournament. The Friars received an at-large bid to the National Invitation Tournament where they defeated Charlotte and Robert Morris to advance to the NIT quarterfinals. There they lost to the eventual NIT champions, Baylor.

Previous season 
The Friars finished the 2011–12 season 15–7, 4–14 in Big East play to finish in 16th place. They lost to Seton Hall in the first round of the Big East tournament.

Offseason

Incoming recruits

Class of 2013 recruits

Roster

Depth chart

Schedule 

|-
!colspan=8| Exhibition games

|-
!colspan=8| Non-conference games

|-
!colspan=8| Big East regular season

|-
!colspan=8| Big East tournament

|-
!colspan=8| NIT

Awards and honors

References

Providence Friars men's basketball seasons
Providence
Providence
Providence
Providence